18 and 19 Brook Green are two Grade II listed Georgian houses at 18–19 Brook Green, Hammersmith, London, W6.

The houses were built in the early 19th century.

References

Grade II listed buildings in the London Borough of Hammersmith and Fulham
Grade II listed houses in London
Houses in the London Borough of Hammersmith and Fulham
Houses completed in the 19th century